The 38th Los Angeles Film Critics Association Awards, given by the Los Angeles Film Critics Association (LAFCA), honored the best in film for 2012.

Winners

Best Picture:
Amour
Runner-up: The Master
Best Director:
Paul Thomas Anderson – The Master
Runner-up: Kathryn Bigelow – Zero Dark Thirty
Best Actor:
Joaquin Phoenix – The Master
Runner-up: Denis Lavant – Holy Motors
Best Actress (TIE):
Jennifer Lawrence – Silver Linings Playbook
Emmanuelle Riva – Amour
Best Supporting Actor:
Dwight Henry – Beasts of the Southern Wild
Runner-up: Christoph Waltz – Django Unchained
Best Supporting Actress:
Amy Adams – The Master
Runner-up: Anne Hathaway – The Dark Knight Rises and Les Misérables
Best Screenplay:
Chris Terrio – Argo
Runner-up: David O. Russell – Silver Linings Playbook
Best Cinematography:
Roger Deakins – Skyfall
Runner-up: Mihai Mălaimare Jr. – The Master
Best Editing:
Dylan Tichenor and William Goldenberg – Zero Dark Thirty
Runner-up: William Goldenberg – Argo
Best Production Design:
David Crank and Jack Fisk – The Master
Runner-up: Adam Stockhausen – Moonrise Kingdom
Best Music Score:
Dan Romer and Benh Zeitlin – Beasts of the Southern Wild
Runner-up: Jonny Greenwood – The Master
Best Foreign Language Film:
Holy Motors • France/Germany
Runner-up: Footnote (Hearat Shulayim) • Israel
Best Documentary/Non-Fiction Film:
The Gatekeepers
Runner-up: Searching for Sugar Man
Best Animation:
Frankenweenie
Runner-up: It's Such a Beautiful Day
New Generation Award:
Benh Zeitlin – Beasts of the Southern Wild
Career Achievement Award:
Frederick Wiseman
The Douglas Edwards Experimental/Independent Film/Video Award:
Lucien Castaing-Taylor and Véréna Paravel – Leviathan

References

External links
 38th Annual Los Angeles Film Critics Association Awards

2012
Los Angeles Film Critics Association Awards
Los Angeles Film Critics Association Awards
Los Angeles Film Critics Association Awards
Los Angeles Film Critics Association Awards